The 2021 season for  was the 37th season in the team's existence and the seventh season under the current name. The team has been a UCI WorldTeam since 2005, when the tier was first established.

Team roster 

Riders who joined the team for the 2021 season

Riders who left the team during or after the 2020 season

Season victories

Notes

References

External links 

 

Lotto–Soudal
2021
Lotto–Soudal